The Gros Van (2,189 m) is a mountain of the Swiss Prealps, overlooking the Col des Mosses in the canton of Vaud. It lies on the range between the Lac de l'Hongrin and the valley of Ormont-Dessous.

References

External links
 Gros Van on Hikr

Mountains of Switzerland
Mountains of the Alps
Mountains of the canton of Vaud